Museum of Soviet occupation may refer to:
 Museum of the Occupation of Latvia
 Museum of Occupations and Freedom Fights (Lithuania)
 Museum of Soviet Occupation, Kyiv (Ukraine)
 Museum of Soviet Occupation (Tbilisi) (Georgia)
 Muzeul Memoriei Neamului (Moldova)
 Vabamu Museum of Occupations and Freedom (Estonia)